The Diocese of Matanzas is a Latin Church ecclesiastic territory or diocese of the Catholic Church in Cuba. It is a suffragan diocese in the ecclesiastical province of the metropolitan Archdiocese of San Cristobal de la Habana. The diocese was erected 10 December 1912.

Bishops

Ordinaries
Charles Warren Currier (1913 - 1914)
Severiano Sainz y Bencamo (1915 - 1937)
Alberto Martín y Villaverde (1938 - 1960)
José Maximino Eusebio Domínguez y Rodríguez (1961 - 1986)
Mariano Vivanco Valiente (1987 - 2004)
Manuel Hilario de Céspedes y García Menocal (2005 - 2022)

Other priests of this diocese who became bishops
Jaime Lucas Ortega y Alamino, appointed Bishop of Pinar del Rio in 1978; future Cardinal
Agustín Alejo (Aleido) Román Rodríguez, appointed Auxiliary Bishop of Miami, Florida, USA in 1979
Felipe de Jesús Estévez (priest here, 1970–1979), appointed Auxiliary Bishop of Miami, Florida, USA in 2003

External links and references

 Conferencia De Obispos Catolicos De Cuba (Spanish)

Matanzas
Matanzas
Matanzas
1912 establishments in Cuba
Roman Catholic Ecclesiastical Province of (San Cristóbal de) la Habana